{{DISPLAYTITLE:Ice Ic}}

Ice Ic (pronounced "ice one c" or "ice I see") is a metastable cubic crystalline variant of ice. Hans König was the first to identify and deduce the structure of ice Ic. The oxygen atoms in ice Ic are arranged in a diamond structure; it is extremely similar to ice Ih having nearly identical densities and the same lattice constant along the hexagonal puckered-planes. It forms at temperatures between  upon cooling, and can exist up to  upon warming, when it transforms into ice Ih. 

Apart from forming from supercooled water, ice Ic has also been reported to form from amorphous ice as well as from the high-pressure ices II, III and V. It can form in and is occasionally present in the upper atmosphere and is believed to be responsible for the observation of Scheiner's halo, a rare ring that occurs near 28 degrees from the Sun or the Moon.

Ordinary water ice is known as ice Ih (in the Bridgman nomenclature). Different types of ice, from ice II to ice XIX, have been created in the laboratory at different temperatures and pressures.

Some authors have expressed doubts whether ice Ic really has a cubic crystal system, claiming that it is merely stacking-disordered ice I (“ice Isd”), and it has been dubbed the ″most faceted ice phase in a literal and a more general sense.″ However, in 2020, two research groups individually prepared ice Ic without stacking disorder; Komatsu et al. prepared C2 hydrate at high pressure and decompressed it at 100 K to make hydrogen molecules extracted from the structure, resulting in ice Ic without stacking disorder; del Rosso et al. prepared ice XVII from C0 hydrate and heated it at 0 GPa to obtain pure ice Ic without stacking disorder.

See also
Ice I, for the other crystalline form of ice

References

Water ice